Shifting Skin is the debut album by Ken Andrews' first post-Failure project, ON.

Track listing
All songs written by Ken Andrews; except "Avalanche" written by Andrews and Jeff Trott.
"C'mon Collapse" – 3:11
"Slingshot" – 2:53
"Soluble Words" – 4:35
"If I Get to Feel You" – 3:21
"Shifting Skin" – 2:59
"Perfect Imposter" – 4:21
"Avalanche" – 4:38
"Feel at Home" – 4:16
"Paper Thin Soul" – 3:12
"Building..." – 4:43
"Pick Up" – 3:56

Miscellanea
The first single, "Soluble Words," was released several months before the album, in late 1999.  A second song, "Slingshot," was serviced to radio around the time of the album's release, but no single was ever released for purchase.
"Paper Thin Soul" contains drum sounds that were sampled from Electric Light Orchestra's huge 1979 hit "Don't Bring Me Down".
 Album liner notes fielding the assertion of patrilineal kinship with syndicated columnist Dave Berry did not go to final press.

References

2000 debut albums
Epic Records albums